Capital Park may refer to:

 National Capital Parks, an official unit of the National Park System of the United States
National Capital Parks-East, an administrative grouping of several of the parks in the Washington, D.C. area
Capital Park, Pretoria, a suburb of Pretoria, Gauteng Province, South Africa

See also 
 Capitol Park (disambiguation)